Thestor rossouwi, the Rossouw's skolly, is a species of butterfly in the family Lycaenidae. It is endemic to South Africa., where it is known from coastal fynbos from between Riversdale and Stilbaai, west to Hermanus, Cape Agulhas and Bredasdorp in the Western Cape.

The wingspan is 27–32 mm for males and 30–36 mm for females. Adults are on wing from September to April. There might be more than one generation per year.

References

Thestor
Butterflies described in 1971
Endemic butterflies of South Africa
Taxonomy articles created by Polbot